Get Big may refer to:

 Get Big (album), 2010 album by Dorrough
 Get Big (film), 2017 American film